Group C was one of four groups of national teams competing in the second stage of the 1982 FIFA World Cup. The group's three matches were staged at the Estadio Sarriá in Barcelona. The group consisted of three teams advancing from the first group stage: Group 1 runners-up Italy, Group 6 winners Brazil and the Group 3 runners-up, the reigning world champions Argentina.

Italy topped the group and advanced to the semi-finals, eventually winning the competition.

In 2007, The Guardian called this group the deadliest-ever Group of Death in FIFA World Cup history.

Qualified teams
The winner of Group 6 and the runners-up of Group 1 and 3 qualified for Group C of the second round.

Standings

Matches

Italy vs Argentina

Argentina vs Brazil

Italy vs Brazil

References

External links
 1982 FIFA World Cup archive
 Spain 1982 FIFA Technical Report: Statistical Details of the Matches pp. 141-145

Group C
Group C
Group C
Group C
1982